The Dears are a Canadian indie rock band from Montreal, Quebec. The band is led by the husband-and-wife duo of singer-guitarist Murray Lightburn and keyboardist Natalia Yanchak.

History
The band formed in 1995 and released their first album, End of a Hollywood Bedtime Story, in 2000. Their orchestral, dark pop sound and dramatic live shows established The Dears as part of the then-emerging Canadian indie renaissance.

The Dears performed in Toronto in October 2001 with Sloan. In 2001 and 2002, they released the EPs Orchestral Pop Noir Romantique and Protest, respectively, as well as a collection of unreleased songs, Nor the Dahlias. In 2003 they released their second full-length album No Cities Left, and a string of shows at SXSW '04 launched their international career.

The Dears toured extensively across Canada, U.S., UK, Europe, Japan and Australia supporting the international release of No Cities Left and returned to the studio to record in 2005. Gang of Losers was released in 2006, and was well received by the press.

The Dears have had high-profile gigs as opening act for Sloan, The Tragically Hip, Keane, The Secret Machines and Morrissey, to whom Lightburn is often compared. Their music has been described as a cross between The Smiths and Serge Gainsbourg with Lightburn's singing voice being likened to Morrissey as well as Blur's Damon Albarn. The complexity of the music and arrangements has also been compared to Radiohead, Jethro Tull and early Genesis. The Dears' powerful live shows have been described as: "...the sonic equivalent of seeing the face of God."

On July 10, 2007, The Dears' album Gang of Losers was named to the shortlist for the 2007 Polaris Music Prize. The follow-up Missiles was released in the United Kingdom on October 20 and in North America on October 21, 2008.

On February 15, 2011, The Dears released their fifth studio album, Degeneration Street. The album was named as a longlisted nominee for the 2011 Polaris Music Prize.

Band members

Current members
Murray Lightburn (since 1995) - vocals, guitar, keyboards, percussion, bass
Natalia Yanchak (since 1998) - keyboards, vocals
Jeff Luciani (since 2010) - drums
Steve Raegele (since 2015) - guitar
Rémi-Jean LeBlanc (since 2019) - bass

Past members
Clinton Ryder (2018) - touring bass player
Tessa Kautzman (2016-2017) - touring bass player
Rob Benvie (2002–2003, 2009, 2016–2017) - guitar, bass, keyboards, percussion, vocals
Patrick Krief (2003–2008, 2010–2015) - guitar, vocals, piano
Roberto Arquilla (1997–2000, 2010–2015) - bass
Laura Wills (2008–2009) - touring keyboards, vocals
Jason Kent (2008–2009, 2017) - touring guitar, vocals, keyboards
Christopher McCarron (2008–2009) - touring guitar player
Yann Geoffroy (2008–2009) - touring drummer, keyboards
Lisa Smith (2008–2009) - touring bass player
George Donoso III (2001–2008) - drums, vocals
Martin Pelland (2001–2007) - bass, vocals
Valérie Jodoin Keaton (2002–2007) – keyboards, flute, vocals, percussion
Jonathan Cohen (1999–2002) - guitar
Brigitte Mayes (1999–2002) - cello, flute
Richard MacDonald (1995–1998) - guitar
John Tod (1995–2000) - drums
Andrew White (1995–1998) - bass

Timeline

Discography

Studio albums
 2000: End of a Hollywood Bedtime Story
 2003: No Cities Left (No. 127 UK)
 2006: Gang of Losers (No. 52 CAN, No. 77 UK)
 2008: Missiles
 2011: Degeneration Street (No. 37 CAN)
 2015: Times Infinity Volume One
 2017: Times Infinity Volume Two
 2020: Lovers Rock

EPs
 2001: Orchestral Pop Noir Romantique
 2002: Protest
 2009: iTunes Live from Montreal

Compilation albums
 2001: Nor the Dahlias: The Dears 1995-1998

Live albums
 2004: Thank You Good Night Sold Out
 2012: The Dears Live at Pasagüero - Mexico City, Mexico, 2010 (digital only, released by Arts & Crafts Mexico)

Singles
 2004: "We Can Have It"
 2004: "Lost in the Plot"
 2005: "22: The Death of All The Romance"
 2006: "Ticket to Immortality"
 2006: "Whites Only Party"
 2007: "You and I Are a Gang of Losers"
 2008: "Money Babies"
 2010: "Omega Dog"
 2011: "Thrones"
 2015: "I Used To Pray For The Heavens To Fall"
 2015: "Here's to the Death of All the Romance"
 2017: "To Hold and Have"
 2017: "Of Fisticuffs"
 2017: "1998"
 2017: "I'm Sorry That I Wished You Dead"
 2020: "The Worst In Us"
 2020: "Heart Of An Animal"

Other contributions
 Syrup & Gasoline Vol. 2 (2001, Grenadine Records) – "Le pauvre chanteur (From The South Shore)"
Acoustic 07 (2007, V2 Records) – "You and I Are a Gang of Losers"

Awards and nominations

2016: No Cities Left - Shortlisted: 2016 Slaight Family Polaris Heritage Prize (1996-2005).
2011: Degeneration Street – Longlisted: 2011 Polaris Music Prize.
2007: Gang of Losers – Shortlisted: 2007 Polaris Music Prize.
2007: Gang of Losers – Nominated: GAMIQ Awards – International Career, Best Indie Rock Album, Best Concert categories.
2006: Gang of Losers – Nominated: CMW Canadian Independent Music Awards – Favourite Group category.
2006: Whites Only Party  – Winner: CBC Radio 3's Bucky Awards – Catchiest Beat category.
2004: No Cities Left – Nominated in First Round: New Pantheon Music Award.
2004: No Cities Left – Nominated: Juno Award – Best New Group category.
2004: No Cities Left – Nominated: CMW Canadian Independent Music Awards – Favourite Group category.
2003: No Cities Left – Nominated: CASBY Award – Favourite Indie Release.
2002: Orchestral Pop Noir Romantique – Winner: MIMI (Montreal Independent Music Initiative) Awards – Best Production category.
2001: End of a Hollywood Bedtime Story – Nominated: CMW Canadian Independent Music Awards – Best Alternative Album category.
2001: End of a Hollywood Bedtime Story – Nominated: MIMI (Montreal Independent Music Initiative) Awards – Best Album, Best Concert (June 2, 2000), Best Pop Artist categories.

See also

Music of Canada
Music of Quebec
Canadian rock
List of Canadian musicians
List of Quebec musicians
List of bands from Canada
Culture of Quebec

References

External links

 
 

Musical groups established in 1995
Canadian indie rock groups
Musical groups from Montreal
English-language musical groups from Quebec
Arts & Crafts Productions artists
MapleMusic Recordings artists
Bella Union artists
Albert Productions artists
Dangerbird Records artists